Carlos Alberto Bulla (born 6 October 1943) is an Argentine former footballer who competed in the 1964 Summer Olympics.

References

External links 
 

1943 births
Living people
Association football forwards
Argentine footballers
Olympic footballers of Argentina
Footballers at the 1964 Summer Olympics
Rosario Central footballers